Bistorta affinis (synonyms Polygonum affine, Persicaria affinis), the Himalayan bistort, fleece flower, or knotweed, is a species of flowering plant in the family Polygonaceae, native to the Himalayas (Tibet, Nepal, northern India, Pakistan, Kashmir).

Description
The narrow elliptic leaves are white on the underside because of a waxy coating. Leaves are mostly at the base, 3–8 cm long, with the base narrowed to a short stalk. Leaf margins are entire or very finely toothed. The mid-vein is prominent. Cylindrical spikes of many pale pink or rose-red flowers are borne at the top of short erect stems, from midsummer to autumn. Stamens protrude slightly out of the flowers. Flowering stems are several, 5–25 cm tall, with very few smaller leaves. When the flowers have died, they tend to persist on the plant into winter.

Habitat

Cultivation
Bistorta affinis is used ornamentally as groundcover. Under the synonym Persicaria affinis the following cultivars have gained the Royal Horticultural Society's Award of Garden Merit: 
'Darjeeling Red' 
'Donald Lowndes' 
'Superba'

References

affinis
Flora of West Himalaya
Flora of Jammu and Kashmir
Flora of Nepal
Flora of Pakistan
Flora of Tibet
Plants described in 1825
Garden plants of Asia
Groundcovers
Perennial plants